Lippy may refer to:


People

Nickname
 Philip Deignan (born 1983), Irish road racing cyclist
 Leo Durocher (1905-1991), American Major League Baseball player, manager and coach, member of the Baseball Hall of Fame
 Alexander Lipmann-Kessel (1914–1986), South African orthopaedic surgeon and Second World War medical officer
 Lippy Lipshitz (1903–1980), South African sculptor, painter and printmaker
 Dolly Vanderlip (born 1937), American former pitcher in the All-American Girls Professional Baseball League

Surname
 Bill Lippy, member of the International Jewish Sports Hall of Fame as an official/administrator
 T. S. Lippy (c. 1860-1931), American millionaire and philanthropist who struck it rich in the Klondike Gold Rush

Fictional characters
 a Hanna-Barbera cartoon character - see Lippy the Lion and Hardy Har Har
 Lippy, twin brother of Zippy the Pinhead, a comic strip character
 Lippy Jones, in the American miniseries Lonesome Dove and Return to Lonesome Dove

Other uses
 slang for lipstick
 Forpet or lippy, an old Scottish unit of dry measure

See also
 Lippi, an Italian surname
 Lipy (disambiguation), several places in Poland

Lists of people by nickname